The Cheepay River is a river in northeastern Kenora District in northeastern Ontario, Canada. It is in the James Bay drainage basin and is a right tributary of the Albany River.

The Cheepay River begins in muskeg and flows northeast then north to its mouth at the Albany River, which flows to James Bay.

The unincorporated place of Ghost River and Cheepay Island, the latter officially in Kenora District, are at the river mouth.

References

Sources

Rivers of Cochrane District